Real People is a 1970s television show that aired on NBC in the United States.

Real People may refer to:

 Real People (album), a 1980 album by funk/disco group Chic
 "Real People" (song), by Chic
 The Real People, a British indie band
 Realpeople, a side project of Zach F. Condon, better known from his solo musical project Beirut
 Real People, a 2015 album by rapper Lyrics Born
 "Real People", a song by Ice Cube and Common from the 2016 soundtrack Barbershop: The Next Cut

See also
 Real People Group, a South African company